The Central Congolian lowland forests are an ecoregion within the Democratic Republic of the Congo. This is a remote, inaccessible area of low-lying dense wet forest, undergrowth and swamp in the Cuvette Centrale region of the Congo Basin south of the arc of the River Congo.

Fauna
The region has been insufficiently researched by zoologists but is known to be home to antelopes, forest elephants, and several primates, including the rare bonobo (Pan paniscus), De Brazza's monkey, crested mangabey and the lowland gorilla.  There is only one known strictly endemic mammal, the Dryas monkey (Cercopithecus dryas). Other near-endemic mammals include the golden-bellied mangabey (Cercocebus chrysogaster), bonobo (Pan paniscus, EN), okapi (Okapia johnstoni), Allen's swamp monkey (Allenopithecus nigroviridis), Angolan kusimanse (Crossarchus ansorgei), Thollon's red colobus (Procolobus tholloni) and Wolf's mona monkey (Cercopithecus wolfi).

There are two birds that are near-endemic in the region: the Congo peafowl (Afropavo congensis, VU) and the yellow-legged weaver (Malimbus flavipes).

Threats and conservation
The forest remains largely unspoilt as human population is limited to small communities who hunt and fish along the many rivers that cross this remote, swampy region. However many animals are vulnerable to poaching, and their movements are restricted by the network of waterways. Meanwhile Salonga National Park is a huge protected area within the region, one of the largest national parks in the world, and the second largest tropical forest national park in the world.

Urban areas and settlements
The Cuvette Centrale is remote and sparsely populated, there are some riverside markets and villages such as Ikela but access to this area is difficult (by dugout canoe) and/or expensive (there are airstrips near Salonga Park).

External links

detailed study of Salonga National Park
 http://www.zoosociety.org/Conservation/Bonobo/BCBI/Salonga.php
 http://www.eoearth.org/article/Salonga_National_Park,_Democratic_Republic_of_Congo

References

Afrotropical ecoregions
Congolian forests
Ecoregions of the Democratic Republic of the Congo